Daniel O'Leary (October 22, 1856 – June 24, 1922), also known as "Hustlin' Dan", was an American Major League Baseball player from Detroit. The last season he played and managed the Cincinnati Outlaw Reds of the Union Association.

O'Leary died in Chicago at the age of 65, and was buried at Mount Carmel Cemetery in Hillside, Illinois.

See also
List of Major League Baseball player–managers

References

External links

1856 births
1922 deaths
19th-century baseball players
Baseball players from Detroit
Major League Baseball outfielders
Major League Baseball player-managers
Providence Grays players
Boston Red Caps players
Detroit Wolverines players
Worcester Ruby Legs players
Cincinnati Outlaw Reds players
Minor league baseball managers
Minneapolis Browns players
Lynn Live Oaks players
Worcester (minor league baseball) players
Lowell (minor league baseball) players
Manchester (minor league baseball) players
Springfield (minor league baseball) players